Polisportiva Virtus Castelfranco Calcio is an Italian association football club located in Castelfranco Emilia, Emilia-Romagna. It currently plays in Serie D.

History 
The club was founded in 1959.

Serie D 
In the season 2003–04 it was promoted from Eccellenza Emilia–Romagna to Serie D.

Colors and badge 
Its colors are white and yellow.

External links 
Romagnasport Site

Football clubs in Italy
Association football clubs established in 1959
Football clubs in Emilia-Romagna
1959 establishments in Italy